Tepličky is a village and municipality in Hlohovec District in the Trnava Region of western Slovakia.

History
In historical records the village was first mentioned in 1113.

Geography
The municipality lies at an altitude of 215 metres and covers an area of 5.675 km². It has a population of about 275 people.

References

External links
http://www.statistics.sk/mosmis/eng/run.html

Villages and municipalities in Hlohovec District